According to Article 168 of the Constitution of Costa Rica, the political divisions are officially classified into 3 tiers of sub-national entities.

Overview
The Constitution of Costa Rica states, "For Public Administration purposes, the national territory is divided into provinces, these into cantons and cantons into districts." The country consists of 7 provinces (provincias), 82 cantons (cantones), and 473 districts (distritos).

List of provinces

See also
ISO 3166-2:CR
Cantons of Costa Rica
Districts of Costa Rica
List of Costa Rican provinces by Human Development Index

References

External links

 
Subdivisions of Costa Rica
Costa Rica
Costa Rica 1
Provinces, Costa Rica
Costa Rica geography-related lists